J. Keith Arnold (born July 21, 1959) is a former member of the Florida House of Representatives representing the 73rd district from 1982 to 1998. He was born in Fort Myers, Florida. He received his Bachelor's degree from the Florida State University in 1981. He lives in Fort Myers, Florida with his family.

External links
Official Bio for Representative Arnold

Florida State University alumni
Democratic Party members of the Florida House of Representatives
1959 births
Living people
People from Fort Myers, Florida